The 2002–03 season was the 106th season of competitive football by Heart of Midlothian, and their 20th consecutive season in the top level of Scottish football, competing in the Scottish Premier League. Hearts also competed in the Scottish Cup and League Cup.

Fixtures

Pre-Season Friendlies

Scottish Premier League

League Cup

Scottish Cup

League table

See also
List of Heart of Midlothian F.C. seasons

References

External links 
 Official Club website
 Complete Statistical Record

Heart of Midlothian F.C. seasons
Heart of Midlothian F.C.